Rabha Jatiya Aikya Manch (RJAM) is a regional political party in Assam, India.

Political parties in Assam
Assam articles needing expert attention
Political parties with year of establishment missing

References